Daniel Dohou Dossou (born 30 September 1959) is a Beninese judoka. He competed in the men's lightweight event at the 1988 Summer Olympics.

References

1959 births
Living people
Beninese male judoka
Olympic judoka of Benin
Judoka at the 1988 Summer Olympics
Place of birth missing (living people)